Carlos Antonio Gutiérrez Barriga (born 11 September 1977)  is a Mexican former footballer who last played for UNAM and current manager of Ascenso MX club Venados F.C.

External links

1977 births
Living people
Footballers from Mexico City
Liga MX players
Club Universidad Nacional footballers
Mexican footballers
Association football midfielders